Rhetoric